The Estadio Rafael Hernández Ochoa is a multi-use stadium in Coatzacoalcos, Veracruz, Mexico.  It is currently used mostly for football matches and is the home stadium for Tiburones Rojos de Veracruz Premier.  The stadium has a capacity of 4,800 people.

References

External links

Sport in Veracruz
Football venues in Mexico
Athletics (track and field) venues in Mexico